Standings and results for Group 3 of the UEFA Euro 1992 qualifying tournament.

Group 3 consisted of Cyprus, Italy, Hungary, Norway and the USSR.

Final table

Results

Goalscorers

References
UEFA website

Attendances - 

Group 3
1990–91 in Italian football
1991–92 in Italian football
1990–91 in Cypriot football
1991–92 in Cypriot football
1990–91 in Hungarian football
1991–92 in Hungarian football
1990 in Norwegian football
1991 in Norwegian football
1990 in Soviet football
1991 in Soviet football
CIS at UEFA Euro 1992